Apatema apatemella is a moth of the family Autostichidae. It is found on Cyprus.

References

Moths described in 1958
Apatema
Moths of Europe